Middle-Aged Juvenile Novelty Pop Rockers is the ninth studio album of the Filipino alternative rock band Parokya ni Edgar, released in 2010 by Universal Records. This was Vinci Montaner's final album as a permanent member; he left the band in October 2012 but eventually returned following the release of Pogi Years Old in October 2016.

The album's title and artwork is a parody of the comic book and cartoon series Teenage Mutant Ninja Turtles.

Track listing

References

External links 
 Parokya ni Edgar's Facebook Page
 Universal Records Blog
 Official website

2010 albums
Parokya ni Edgar albums
Universal Records (Philippines) albums